Solomon Islands literature began in the 1960s.

History 
The emergence of Solomon Islands written literature (as distinct from oral literature) took place in the context of the development of indigenous Pacific Islander literature in the Pacific region as a whole, beginning in the late 1960s. In 1968, the founding of the University of the South Pacific in Suva provided a stimulus for Pacific Islander literary aspirations.

Creative writing courses and workshops were set up. The South Pacific Arts Society was founded at the University in 1973, and published Pacific Islander literature (poetry and short stories) in the magazine Pacific Islands Monthly. In 1974, the Society founded the publishing house Mana Publications, followed in 1976 by the art and literature journal Mana. The journal published the first anthologies of Solomon Islands poetry.

Notable Solomon Islands writers include John Saunana and Celo Kulagoe.

See also

Culture of the Solomon Islands

References

 
Solomon Islands